The Guest Book is an American anthology comedy television series created by Greg Garcia. Season one starred Charlie Robinson, Carly Jibson, Lou Wilson, and Kellie Martin, while season two starred Jibson, Eddie Steeples, Kimiko Glenn, Jimmy Tatro, and Dan Beirne. 

The series centers on the lives of the employees of, and visitors to, vacation rental properties: season one focuses on the renters of Froggy Cottage in the small mountain town of Mount Trace, while season two follows the renters of Barefeet Retreat in the oceanside town of Mabel Beach. The regular cast plays residents in the town(s), while each episode is focused on a different guest star who plays an out-of-town vacationer. Garcia, who based the show on his habit of writing fake guest-book entries while on vacation, wrote all the episodes, and makes brief season-two appearances as street beggar Homeless Jack.

The series premiered on TBS on August 3, 2017. On September 13, 2017, TBS renewed it for a second season, which premiered on October 23, 2018.
Garcia tweeted on September 12, 2019 that TBS had cancelled the series.

Cast and characters

Main
Charlie Robinson as Wilfred (season 1; guest season 2), the caretaker of Froggy Cottage, the mountain rental.
Carly Jibson as Vivian “Tickles” Williams, the owner of Chubby's, the local strip club near Froggy Cottage. In season 2, she is a waitress at Emmy Lou's Grill, the restaurant near Barefeet Retreat, the beach rental.
Lou Wilson as Frank (season 1; guest season 2), Vivian's stepson.
Kellie Martin as Officer Kimberly Leahy (season 1; guest season 2)
Eddie Steeples as Eddie (season 2; recurring season 1), Wilfred and Emma's nephew.
Kimiko Glenn as Nikki (season 2), Tommy’s fiancée, a waitress at Emmy Lou's Grill.
Jimmy Tatro as Bodhi (season 2), Eddie's friend, target of Vivian's lustful desires.
Dan Beirne as Tommy (season 2), manager at Emmy Lou's Grill and caretaker of his mother's beach rental, Barefeet Retreat.

Recurring
Aloma Wright as Emma (season 1; guest season 2), Wilfred's wife.
Garret Dillahunt as Dr. Andrew Brown.
Laura Bell Bundy as Jessica, Andrew's ex-wife.
Trace Garcia as Bryce, Andrew and Jessica's son.
Margo Martindale as Alice, Kimberly's mother.
Arjay Smith as Arlo (season 1), a fan of the show, seen only in cold open summarizing the previous week's episode to coworker Woody to entice him to watch the series.
John Milhiser as Woody (season 1), Arlo's coworker, who never gets around to watching the series.
Tipper Newton as Sinnomin (season 1; guest season 2), Vivian's employee.
Melanie Mosley as Kombucha, Vivian's employee.
Jack Donner as Walter, an elderly Chubby's patron.
honeyhoney as Chubby's house band, a mailwoman (Suzanne Santo) and an exterminator (Benjamin Jaffe). In season 2, they relocate to Mabel Beach, take jobs as a food-cart lady and a lifeguard, and play at Emmy Lou's Grill.

Episodes

The intended fifth episode of the series was originally intended to air on August 24, 2017, but was held back as it "contained elements that were deemed too sensitive" at that point in time. At the end of August 2017, Garcia noted on Twitter that the held episode would not be made available "for awhile", and that he hopes that it will be released at a later date. In mid-September, Garcia again posted on Twitter and confirmed that the episode would air the next Thursday as the eighth episode of the season, albeit in an edited form to fit its new place in the show's continuity.

When the episode aired, the sensitive elements were revealed to be in relation to the Unite the Right rally which took place two weeks before the episode was originally due to air. The episode depicted an Alzheimer's patient regaining his spousal abuse tendencies and racist personality - going as far as sewing and wearing a KKK outfit with the intention of attending a rally, while also revealing he once murdered an African American while burning down a local black church.

Season 1 (2017)

Season 2 (2018)

Reception

Critical response
On the review aggregator website Rotten Tomatoes, the series has an approval rating of 64%  based on 11 reviews, with an average rating of 6.33 out of 10. The site's critical consensus reads, "An outstanding cast and sporadically sharp humor make The Guest Book worth checking out, even if its anthology formula leads to a bumpy journey from episode to episode." Metacritic, which uses a weighted average, assigned a score of 55 out of 100 based on 9 reviews.

Ratings

References

External links
 
 

2017 American television series debuts
2018 American television series endings
2010s American anthology television series
2010s American sitcoms
English-language television shows
Television series by Studio T
TBS (American TV channel) original programming
Television series by CBS Studios